Silas Bent (1888–1945) was American journalist, author, and lecturer.

Silas Bent may also refer to:
 Silas Bent (naval officer) (1820–1887), U.S. Naval officer prior to the American Civil War, assigned to the Hydrographic Division of the Coast Survey
 USNS Silas Bent (T-AGS-26), Silas Bent-class U.S. Navy hydrographic survey ship
 Silas Bent (judge) (1768–1827), judge on the Missouri Supreme Court

Bent, Silas